Skookumchuck is in the East Kootenay region of southeastern British Columbia. This locality straddles both shores of the Kootenay River north of the mouth of the Lussier River.

Name origin
The name derives from Skookumchuck Creek, which an 1880s account describes the idea as "stream of the rapid torrent". Prior to erecting this link in the 1920s, the community on the east end was called Springbrook and the general area on the west side was called Skookumchuck. Subsequently, the merged communities adopted the more dominant Skookumchuck identity.

Transportation
Since the 1890s, the basic elements have been similar to Wasa road and river and Wasa rail.

Community
Although mining and logging had attracted settlers, the commencement of rail service in 1915 prompted further growth. John W. Blake was the inaugural postmaster 1915–1921. By 1918, he ran a general store near the station, but the few surrounding houses were soon deserted after the occupants moved farther north or west.

Around 1940, the Springbrook log cabins and a log grocery store were erected.
A two-storey motel was added in the mid-1960s, and the log store burned to the ground in the mid-1970s. The rebuild was across the highway. In 1967, the telephone exchange opened.

In 1968, the establishment of the Skookumchuck Pulp Mill near the creek brought new subdivisions at Skookumchuck and new residents to the general area. Mill upgrades totalled $17 million in 1975, $22 million in 1985, and $279 million in 1993. A $50 million woodwaste cogeneration plant opened in 2001. In 2013, Paper Excellence Canada Holdings bought the mill from Tembecs for $89 million. In 2021, the mill was fined over $100,000 for exceeding permitted limits in treated wastewater discharges and air emissions.

The community infrastructure includes a convenience store/gas bar, and a motel/RV park/campground.

Education
Larchwood school was regarded as being in Skookumchuck. In 1921, classes began for mill workers' children. Over the years, a series of schoolhouses and residences housed the students. By 1938, the school was farther south near the Skookumchuck train station. Enrolments included children from Torrent. The final school year was 1943/44.

The location was a stage stopping place. The school, which existed 1932–1952, was immediately northwest of Premier Lake. In 1949, a new building was erected. During this era, a school bus ran from Springbrook. In 1952, the new portable building of Springbrook Elementary, replaced the log-cabin school at remote Sheep Creek. Springbrook closed in 1957.

Footnotes

References

Unincorporated settlements in British Columbia
Chinook Jargon place names
Populated places in the Regional District of East Kootenay